Friðrik Guðmundsson can refer to:

 Friðrik Guðmundsson (athlete) (1925-2002), Icelandic Olympic athlete
 Friðrik Guðmundsson (swimmer) (born 1955), Icelandic Olympic swimmer